Jacinto Francisco Fernández de Quincoces y López de Arbina (17 July 1905 – 10 May 1997) was a Spanish football player and manager, as well as President of the Valencian Pilota Federation. He was a central defender and is regarded as one of the greatest defenders of the inter-war era.

He played 25 matches for the Spain national football team from 1928 to 1936. He was part of Spain's team at the 1928 Summer Olympics, and was part of Spain's 1934 FIFA World Cup team. He was Spain's national coach in 1945, taking charge for two matches.

Playing career
 Deportivo Alavés – 1920–1931
 Real Madrid – 1931–1936, 1939–1942 (hiatus due to Spanish Civil War)

Management career
 Real Zaragoza – 1942–1943, 1956–1958
 Spain national football team – 1945
 Real Madrid – 1945–1946, 1947–1948
 Valencia CF – 1948–1954, 1958–1960
 Atlético Madrid – 1954–1955

President of the FPV 
Since Quincoces was a Basque pelota pala player before becoming a football professional, when his career finished, he was chosen by the Francoist authorities as President of the Valencian Pilota Federation, believing that Basque and Valencian handball sports were the same. Quincoces declared to the press several times that he was unwilling to undertake this task, but while he was in charge (late 1960s and early 70s) he promoted new measures that resulted in profit for Valencian pilota, such as the beginning of the Youth Championships, compulsory for the trinquets that wanted to host professional tournaments, this was the way pilotaris such as Genovés I and Xatet de Carlet began.

References

External links
 

1905 births
1997 deaths
Spanish footballers
Spain international footballers
Spanish football managers
Spain national football team managers
Olympic footballers of Spain
Footballers at the 1928 Summer Olympics
1934 FIFA World Cup players
Deportivo Alavés players
Real Madrid CF players
Real Zaragoza managers
Real Madrid CF managers
Valencia CF managers
Atlético Madrid managers
Pilotaris from the Valencian Community
Association football defenders
La Liga players
La Liga managers
Segunda División players
Segunda División managers
Footballers from Barakaldo
Basque Country international footballers